Turning Point USA (TPUSA), or Turning Point, is an American nonprofit organization that advocates for conservative politics on high school, college, and university campuses. It was founded in 2012 by Charlie Kirk and Bill Montgomery. TPUSA's sister organizations include Turning Point Endowment, Turning Point Action, Students for Trump, and Turning Point Faith. TPUSA has been described as the fastest growing organization of campus chapters in America, and according to The Chronicle of Higher Education, TPUSA "is now the dominant force in campus conservatism".

The organization started Professor Watchlist, a website that claims to expose professors that TPUSA says "discriminate against conservative students and advance leftist propaganda in the classroom". According to The Chronicle of Higher Education, TPUSA has attempted to influence student government elections in an effort to "combat liberalism on college and university campuses." In 2021, TPUSA also started the School Board Watchlist website. It publishes the names and photos of school board members who have adopted mask mandates or anti-racist curricula.

TPUSA annually hosts several conferences on various topics throughout the year, such as the Student Action Summit, Young Women's Leadership Summit, Young Black Leadership Summit, AmericaFest, and Young Latino Leadership Summit. The organization is funded by conservative donors and foundations, including Republican Party politicians.

History

At Youth Government Day in 2012, 18-year old Charlie Kirk gave a speech at Benedictine University. Impressed by the teenager, seasoned political operative Bill Montgomery encouraged Kirk to postpone college and engage full-time in political activism. In June 2012, the day after Charlie Kirk graduated from high school, he founded Turning Point USA, a section 501(c)(3) nonprofit organization. Montgomery became Kirk's mentor, and worked behind the scenes handling the paperwork for the organization. Montgomery often described himself as the group's co-founder, although it was not an official recognition by the group or Kirk.

At the 2012 Republican National Convention, Kirk met Foster Friess, a Republican donor, and persuaded him to finance the organization. Friess also serves on the organization's advisory council, alongside Ginni Thomas, wife of U.S. Supreme Court Justice Clarence Thomas. Barry Russell, president and CEO of the Independent Petroleum Association of America (IPAA), is a key advisor.

Between July 2016 and June 2017, the organization raised in excess of US$8.2 million. The same year, leaked records found that the group had funnelled "thousands of dollars" into student governments to elect conservatives. Donors include Home Depot co-founder Bernard Marcus, former Illinois Governor Bruce Rauner, Richard Uihlein, and the Donors Trust on behalf of private donors.

TPUSA says its mission is "to identify, educate, train, and organize students to promote the principles of freedom, free markets, and limited government". TPUSA has three key beliefs about culture and politics, listed on its website: 

 The United States of America is the greatest country in the history of the world.
 The US Constitution is the most exceptional political document ever written.
 Capitalism is the most moral and proven economic system ever discovered

Leadership and associates

Charlie Kirk

Charlie Kirk is a conservative activist.

In a 2015 speech at the Liberty Forum of Silicon Valley, Kirk said that he had applied to the United States Military Academy in West Point, New York, and was not accepted. He said that "the slot he considered his went to 'a far less-qualified candidate of a different gender and a different persuasion'" whose test scores he claimed he knew. In 2017 he told The New Yorker that he was being sarcastic when he said it, and at a New Hampshire Turning Point event featuring Senator Rand Paul in October 2019 he claimed that he never said it.

Kirk addressed the 2016 Republican National Convention. In an interview with Wired magazine during the convention, Kirk said that while he "was not the world's biggest Donald Trump fan," he would vote for him, and that Trump's candidacy made Turning Point's mission more difficult. He spent the rest of the 2016 presidential campaign assisting with travel and media arrangements and running errands for Donald Trump Jr.

Several former employees and student volunteers for Turning Point claimed they had witnessed collusion between high-ranking Turning Point employees – including Kirk himself and top advisor Ginni Thomas – and the presidential campaigns of both Ted Cruz and Marco Rubio. The interactions included Kirk coordinating via email with two officials at a pro-Cruz super PAC to send student volunteers to work for the PAC in South Carolina, as well as two students being requested by Thomas herself, via voicemail, to distribute over 200 Cruz placards in Wisconsin. A former employee for Turning Point, who had been based in Florida, alleged that Turning Point had given the personal information of over 700 student supporters to an employee with Rubio's presidential campaign.

In October 2016, Kirk participated in a Fox News event along with Donald Trump Jr., Eric Trump, and Lara Trump that had a pro-Donald Trump tone. A Turning Point staff member wrote on Facebook that students who attended the event would have their expenses covered. The event led tax experts to say the organization's conduct may have violated its tax-exempt status, a charge disputed by Turning Point.

In 2019, Charlie Kirk became CEO of Students for Trump. In 2020, he was a keynote speaker on the first day of the Republican National Convention, calling President Donald Trump the "bodyguard of western civilization."

Bill Montgomery
Montgomery (1940–2020) was a marketing entrepreneur and onetime participant in the Tea Party movement. He launched Turning Point with Kirk in 2012 and served as the organization's secretary and treasurer until April 2020.

Montgomery died of complications resulting from contracting COVID-19 in July 2020.

Tyler Bowyer
Bowyer became the organizations's chief operating officer (COO) in 2017.  He graduated from Arizona State University in 2012 with a bachelor's degree.  He was chairman of the Republican Party of Maricopa County, AZ, for two years before joining TPU as regional manager in 2015. Bowyer also oversees Students for Trump. He is a member of the Church of Jesus Christ of Latter-day Saints and part of an effort in August 2020 to launch a "Latter-day Saints for Trump" coalition.

Others
In February 2019, Turning Point hired Benny Johnson as chief creative officer. Johnson had been fired by BuzzFeed for plagiarism in 2014 and suspended by the Independent Journal Review in 2017 for publishing a conspiracy theory about Barack Obama.

In May 2019, communications director Candace Owens resigned after controversial remarks she made in December 2018 were publicized and some Turning Point campus chapters called for her resignation. She had said in a speech at a conservative event in London that "if Hitler just wanted to make Germany great and have things run well, okay fine. The problem is ... he had dreams outside of Germany. He wanted to globalize." She later stated that "leftist journalists" had mischaracterized her statement.

In May 2019, it was reported that TPUSA's director for high school outreach, Kyle Kashuv, had previously used racially inflammatory language in a Google Document. Kashuv resigned from TPUSA hours after his former classmates threatened to make the screenshots from the document public. Almost a week after the screenshots were published, Kashuv acknowledged that his comments were "callous and inflammatory".

In 2021, political activist Jack Posobiec joined TPUSA to host the show Human Events Daily.

Finances 
Turning Point USA receives funding from a cohort of conservative and right-wing donors and foundations, including several Republican politicians. According to the Center for Media and Democracy, donors include:

 Marcus Foundation (Bernard Marcus): $1,573,000 in 201518
 Illinois Governor Bruce Rauner: $100,000 in 2014
 Darwin Deason: $510,000 in 2014
 Ed Uihlein Family Foundation (Richard Uihlein): $750,000 in 201418
 Lynde and Harry Bradley Foundation: $232,500 in 201418, $100,000 in 2019
 Donors Trust (on behalf of a cohort of right-wing private donors): $610,000 in 2017
 Thomas W. Smith Foundation: $400,000 in 201418
 Einhorn Family Charitable Trust: $120,000 in 201418

Turning Point USA also contributes money to its affiliated operational organizations, including Turning Point Endowment.

In the 201617 financial year, Turning Point reported US$8.2 million in donations to the IRS, an increase from $4.3 million the previous year. The same year, expenses for the group doubled, reaching $8.3 million, most of which were employment related costs ($4.3 million). In 2017, leaked records found that the group had funnelled "thousands of dollars" into student governments to elect conservative candidates.

In 2019, TPUSA's reported revenues from donors were $28.5 million, and CEO Charlie Kirk's compensation was $292,423.

Turning Point USA's revenues have grown from $78,000 in 2013 to $39.8 million in 2020. In 2020, Turning Point Endowment had revenues of $16,576,350.

In August 2021, Turning Point USA distributed a "2021 Investor Prospectus" that sought to raise $43 million for its national field program, events, media, productions, special projects, Turning Point Academy, and Turning Point Faith. The document stated "'The Left's plan is a path of destruction, a turning back of the clock 500 years to a past that’s deficient of Western influence'" and that "[s]chools in this country have become intolerant and nihilistic dens of anti-American hate as Leftist professors slander our country with impunity and radical mobs shut down conservative speech entirely."

Activities
In late 2017, the organization claimed to have representation on 1,000 campuses. Journalist Joseph Guinto could not verify the number in 2018, finding that Turning Point had 400 officially registered chapters, many of whom showed no activity on their Facebook pages. Each of Turning Point's paid workers is supposed to meet a quota to make at least 1,500 student contacts per semester. Student volunteers have several different themes for promoting conservative ideas, including "The Healthcare Games", "Game of Loans", and "iCapitalism". According to The Washington Post, TPUSA centers "group membership on making provocative claims and publicly inciting outrage".

Turning Point USA supports the NRA and the use of fossil fuels, and opposes groups such as Black Lives Matter. Turning Point USA and Turning Point UK promote the Cultural Marxism conspiracy theory and said they are working to "combat it" in universities. Kirk described universities as "islands of totalitarianism".

Annual summits
Turning Point holds several annual national conferences, including the Student Action Summit and the Young Women's Leadership Summit (YWLS). The National Rifle Association (NRA) was the headline sponsor of the YWLS in 2017 and 2018.  According to The New York Times, YWLS "styles itself as an alternative to a liberal culture of feminism that many Republicans characterize as oppressive" and had by 2018 "evolved into an ultra-Trumpian event complete with 'lock her up' chants and vulgar T-shirts disparaging Hillary Clinton." Candace Owens, who days prior to the 2018 conference stirred controversy by saying "the entire premise of #metoo is that women are stupid, weak, and inconsequential", was greeted with a standing ovation at the conference. Turning Point also hosts the Young Black Leadership Summit and the Young Latino Leadership Summit. Turning Point provided lodging and some meals for the attendees who could also apply for travel stipends. Turning Point USA also launched AmericaFest, a four-day conference that featured conservative speakers such as Donald Trump, Jr., and Sarah Palin interspersed with country music acts in December 2021.

On August 11, 2022, Alejandro Richard Velasquez Gomez, a 19-year-old man from San Antonio, Texas, was arrested after making "credible threats" on Instagram against attendees of the Student Action Summit, an annual conference hosted by Turning Point USA for young conservatives in Tampa, Florida. Velasquez bought a plane ticket from Austin to Tampa, but cancelled his flight the night before the summit. The threat, made on Instagram under the username "LatinoZoomer", mirrored the language used by Elliot Rodger in his statements made before going on a deadly spree in Isla Vista, California, in 2014.

Young Women's Leadership Summit 
The 2022 summit, a conference to promote women's leadership, encouraged women to get married, have children, and become homemakers. Kyle Rittenhouse, a young man who gained notoriety for murder charges in a Kenosha , was brought on stage as the "kind of man they "should want to be attracted to".

Professor Watchlist

First appearing on November 21, 2016, Turning Point USA also operates a website called Professor Watchlist. Kirk has said the site is "dedicated to documenting and exposing college professors who discriminate against conservative students, promote anti-American values, and advance leftist propaganda in the classroom." , more than 250 professors have been added to the site. Reporting from Politico has described that the list contains many inaccuracies, and includes professors listed for things they did not exactly say or do and others listed for being rude to students or for making "clever remarks" about Trump. Talking to New York Times, "Mr. Lamb", a director of constitutional enforcement and transparency at TPUSA admitted that the list was “simply aggregating” academics who had been subject to news reports, and that anyone could report a staff member without evidence.

The website has been criticized for using surveillance type propaganda to manipulate ideas of truth, equality, and freedom. Critics have compared Professor Watchlist to the actions of U.S. Senator Joseph McCarthy, who tried to publicly identify American citizens as Communists and Communist sympathizers in the 1950s. The New York Times wrote that it was "a threat to academic freedom," while Salon commented that it was "a sign of the stupidity of the post truth era."

In May 2017, Northern Arizona University criminology professor Luis Fernandez said Turning Point surveillance of him had led to multiple threats. In The Harvard Crimson, Harvard University Professor Danielle Allen also said she had been threatened after being targeted by Charlie Kirk and Turning Point.

Hans-Joerg Tiede, a staff member of the American Association of University Professors said of a professor who was named for writing a book chapter on teaching mathematics to minority ethnic children: "She was inundated with death threats. She was Jewish and received antisemitic threats and threats of sexual assault. Instances like that are happening with some regularity". The American Association of University Professors has also called for university administrators, governing bodies, faculty and individuals to "speak out clearly and forcefully to defend academic freedom and to condemn targeted harassment and intimidation of faculty members", with the New York Times describing the site as a threat to academic freedoms.

The Professor Watchlist currently includes Al Sharpton, Angela Y. Davis, Michael Eric Dyson, Ibram X. Kendi, Robin D.G. Kelley, Nikole Hannah-Jones, Joy Reid, Noam Chomsky, James Comey, John Brennan, Hunter Biden, and Peter Strzok.

Involvement in student government elections
Turning Point USA has been involved in influencing student government elections at a number of colleges and universities. Universities that have been targeted by this effort have included Ohio State University, the University of Wisconsin–Madison, and the University of Maryland. These claims led to conservative candidates at the University of Maryland withdrawing from student elections after failing to report assistance from Turning Point.

A private brochure, handed out only to Turning Point donors, highlighted the organization's alleged strategy to take over student governments at universities across the country, and included a list of every Turning Point-supported student who was elected to student government positions in the year 2017. Turning Point said that it had helped more than 50 conservatives win elections to become student-body presidents. When Politico looked into Turning Point's claims, it found the "success rate to be considerably overstated. Some of the students that Turning Point USA claimed to have backed flatly condemned the organization and said they'd never spoken to anyone who works for it."

School Board Watchlist
In 2021, TPUSA launched the School Board Watchlist, a site Kirk said would "hold district leaders accountable for 'dangerous agendas'." The website publishes names and photos of members of school boards that have adopted or supported mask mandates, mandatory COVID-19 vaccinations, and the way history, race, and conceptions of gender and sex are taught in schools.

Activism

In 2016, Turning Point at Grand Valley State University filed a lawsuit against the trustees of the school. The complainants asked the court to prohibit enforcement of GVSU's Speech Zone policy and declare it a violation of the students' 1st and 14th Amendment freedoms. They have since reached a settlement.

In September 2017, a University of Nebraska lecturer, Courtney Lawton was reassigned after a video was posted online showing her confronting a student recruiting for TPUSA.

In October 2017, several Turning Point student members at Kent State University conducted a protest against campus "safe space" culture, which involved members dressing up in diapers as babies. Following widespread ridicule on social media, the president of the chapter, Kaitlin Bennett, resigned, and the student-run publication KentWired.com reported that the Turning Point chapter at Kent State had disbanded.

Media 
In October 2020, Kirk began hosting a daily three-hour radio talk show on Salem Media's "The Answer" radio channel.

In September 2021, TPUSA launched TPUSA LIVE, a three-hour streaming talk show featuring host John Root and selling "Save America" merchandize.

Turning Point USA’s online audience grew from an average of 83,000 to 111,000 in 2020. A dozen social media accounts on Twitter, Facebook, and Instagram combined have more than 10 million followers online.

In 2021, the TPUSA Productions film "A Long Walk in Socialism" was the Rocky Mountain Emmy Award recipient in the category Cultural/Topical documentary.

In 2022, Turning Point USA in partnership with Salem Media Group released "Border Battle", a docuseries about America's southern border.

Political activities

2016 presidential election

Several former employees and student volunteers for Turning Point claimed they had witnessed collusion between high-ranking Turning Point employees – including Kirk himself and top advisor Ginni Thomas – and the presidential campaigns of both Ted Cruz and Marco Rubio. The interactions included Kirk coordinating via email with two officials at a pro-Cruz super PAC to send student volunteers to work for the PAC in South Carolina, as well as two students being requested by Thomas herself, via voicemail, to distribute over 200 Cruz placards in Wisconsin. A former employee for Turning Point, who had been based in Florida, alleged that Turning Point had given the personal information of over 700 student supporters to an employee with Rubio's presidential campaign.

A Turning Point staff member wrote on Facebook that students who attended the event would have their expenses covered. The event led tax experts to say the organization's conduct may have violated its tax-exempt status, a charge disputed by Turning Point.

2020 presidential election

In September 2020, Turning Point USA's affiliate Turning Point Action was reported by The Washington Post to have paid young people in Arizona, some of them minors, to produce thousands of posts with Turning Point content on their own social media accounts and on fake accounts without disclosing their relationship with Turning Point. According to an examination by the newspaper and an independent data science specialist, the campaign was highly coordinated and included similar messaging under the instruction of Turning Point to prevent detection.

In September 2020, Facebook removed 200 accounts and 55 pages as well as 76 Instagram accounts linked to Turning Point USA's marketing agency Rally Forge. The agency had paid teenagers in Phoenix, Arizona, on Turning Point's behalf to use their own and fake accounts and pages for thousands of posts boosting Trump and disparaging Democratic candidate Joe Biden during the 2020 United States presidential election. In October 2020, Facebook banned Rally Forge permanently while Twitter suspended 262 accounts from its platform. Neither organization penalized Turning Point USA or its affiliates, stating that they "could not determine the extent to which the group's leaders were aware of the specific violations carried out on their behalf, such as the use of fake accounts."

Turning Point hosted Trump reelection rallies, some of them featuring Trump surrogates and some of them Trump himself.

2021 United States Capitol attack 

After the 2020 election, Kirk disputed the results and denied that Trump had lost. On January 4, 2021, Kirk announced that Turning Point would be sending more than 80 buses to a January 6, 2021, Trump rally near the White House in Washington, D.C, to protest the outcome of the election. They sent seven buses with approximately 350 participants. The rally, which was attended by several thousand Trump supporters, ended in a riot and the attack at the U.S. Capitol, where Biden's win was about to be certified. Kirk later deleted the tweet and said on his podcast that it was "bad judgment" and "not wise" to enter the Capitol but not necessarily insurrectionist.

Activities on campuses
At Drake University, Turning Point was denied recognition as an official student organization based on student senate concerns that the organization has "a hateful record," "aggressive marketing" and "an unethical privacy concern."

At Hagerstown Community College, a student's attempt to start a Turning Point group was initially blocked when the school said the organization duplicated an existing group. The student's lawsuit led to the school revising its policy on student organizations, clarifying that school funded groups will be denied if they duplicate existing groups while unfunded groups face no such restriction.

In February 2017, Santa Clara University's student government voted to deny recognition for Turning Point as a campus organization. As of March 2017, this decision was overturned by the Vice Provost for Student Life, and Turning Point has been recognized as a registered student organization.

Wartburg College's student senate voted to deny Turning Point USA recognition in late November. The chapter was forced to make changes to its constitution after initially being denied approval.

The Executive Board of the student union of Rensselaer Polytechnic Institute also voted on January 18, 2018 to deny the Turning Point USA chapter status as an officially recognized student organization.

Wichita State University's student court overturned a decision by the student senate denying a Turning Point Chapter recognition on Campus.  The student court vote was unanimous that the denial of recognition was unconstitutional.

Controversies
In December 2017, The New Yorker published an article by Jane Mayer showcasing interviews with former minority members of TPUSA. Former staff members said they witnessed widespread discrimination against minorities in the group, and stated "the organization was a difficult workplace and rife with tension, some of it racial." One former employee, an African-American woman, said she was the only person of color working for the organization at the time she was hired in 2014; she then said that she was fired on Martin Luther King Jr. Day. The article also revealed text messages sent by Crystal Clanton – who was a leading figure in the organization and served as the group's national field director for five years – to another Turning Point employee saying "i hate black people. Like fuck them all ... I hate blacks. End of story." Kirk responded to the revelations by saying that "Turning Point assessed the situation and took decisive action within 72 hours of being made aware of the issue." The article also noted that Kirk had explicitly praised Clanton in his book Time for a Turning Point, saying that she had been "the best hire we ever could have made", and that "Turning Point needs more Crystals; so does America."

In an April 2018 article titled "Turning Point USA Keeps Accidentally Hiring Racists", HuffPost reported that the woman hired to replace Crystal Clanton had a history of using racial slurs, particularly against African-Americans, on Twitter before deleting her account. In response to the reports, Kirk referred to the individual in question as "a former employee" in his official statement (without clarifying when she had been fired), and Turning Point issued an internal memo announcing that all current and new staff would face social media background checks.

In the Hillsdale College Collegian, opinions editor Kaylee McGhee wrote an article titled "Charlie Kirk and TPUSA aren't conservative, as real conservatives already knew". In the article, McGhee referred to TPUSA as a "reactionary cancer" rather than a group supporting real conservatism that is "supposed to preserve the timeless principles of liberty and equality for all". In June 2018, conservative radio talk show host Joe Walsh resigned from the TPUSA board because Kirk was too closely tied to Donald Trump. Walsh said: "It's so important to not be beholden to politicians, but to be beholden to the issues ... When Charlie went to work for Trump, that crossed that line. You can't advance Trump and advance these issues."

During October and November 2019, Kirk launched the Culture War college tour of speaking events with appearances from many conservatives such as Donald Trump Jr., Lara Trump and Kimberly Guilfoyle. These events were frequently targeted by homophobic and antisemitic members of the alt-right and far-right who consider TPUSA to be too mainstream and not sufficiently conservative. Concerted efforts were made by this group to ask leading questions during the Q&A sections on controversial topics such as Israel and LGBTQ issues in order to challenge the extent of the speakers' views.

In November 2019, the Dartmouth Review called TPUSA an organization that promoted Charlie Kirk and Donald Trump first, rather than conservative values. The article added "True conservatives must eventually outgrow TPUSA and devote their efforts elsewhere. We must challenge ourselves by pursuing an environment of rigorous inquiry, instead of being coddled by the intellectually devoid echo chamber of TPUSA, compromising our values for recognition."

In July 2022, neo-Nazis appeared outside of TPUSA's Student Action Summit in Tampa; they were subsequently not let in. Joy Behar of The View falsely stated that TPUSA invited and embraced neo-Nazi protesters and compared the summit to the Third Reich. The View later issued a retraction, clarifying that "Turning Point USA condemned the Neo-Nazi protesters who had 'nothing to do' with the organization." Host Whoopi Goldberg would later say, "But you let them in, and you knew what they were," and "My point was metaphorical." Following these comments, TPUSA issued a cease and desist request and a deadline of July 27, asking for The View to apologize. In a later episode meeting the deadline, members of The View fully retracted the statements and apologized for making the comparisons.

In January 2023, MSNBC opinion columnist Julio Ricardo Varela criticized Florida Republican congresswoman Anna Paulina Luna, writing that she had "worked with what I consider to be a MAGA white supremacist cult: Turning Point USA." After Turning Point USA's lawyers sent MSBNC a cease-and-desist letter (in which they called the statement "defamatory"), MSNBC modified Varela's column with softer language, referring to  "Turning Point USA's connections to white nationalist beliefs."

Anti-Defamation League and Southern Poverty Law Center
In 2019, the Anti-Defamation League (ADL) has called TPUSA an alt-lite organization. Both the ADL and the Southern Poverty Law Center have criticized TPUSA for affiliating with activists from the alt-right and the far-right. The ADL has also reported that the group's leadership and activists "have made multiple racist or bigoted comments" and have links to extremism.

In 2018, the Southern Poverty Law Center's Hatewatch documented TPUSA's links to white supremacists.

Feud with Young America's Foundation
In May 2018, an internal memo written by Young America's Foundation (YAF) was leaked, in which YAF leadership warned its members to not associate with TPUSA. The memo accused TPUSA of various improprieties, such as exaggerating its number of chapters and activities around the country; taking credit for other organizations' events; increasing attendance at its own events by "boosting numbers with racists & Nazi sympathizers"; and sponsoring "humiliating" campus activism events (a reference to the Kent State diaper incident). In addition, the YAF memo included another memo on the subject circulated internally by Young Americans for Liberty, which accused TPUSA of illegally obtaining YAL's email list and soliciting its students without their permission, which Turning Point only stopped doing after being issued a cease-and-desist order.

After the memo was leaked in June 2018, a representative for TPUSA criticized YAF in a statement to The Chronicle of Higher Education, accusing the group of "abandoning the 'Reagan Rule, known as "Thou shalt not speak ill of any fellow Republican". Although Kirk did not directly respond to the memo, he posted on Twitter that he wished "some conservatives fought the left as hard as they fight people who support President Trump". TPUSA's communications director Candace Owens directly responded to the memo, saying she was "truly speechless" over the memo criticizing Kirk for his lack of college experience. A former employee stated on Twitter that "TPUSA activists do some incredible work. It's a shame the face for their work has become constant, EXTREME inflation of numbers to mislead donors. They have an opportunity to turn this around, and they should."

Internal dissension

After TPUSA's annual "Student Action Summit" in late December 2018, dissidents within the organization, headed by conservative activist Kevin Martin, formed "Heal Our Voice", a group critical of Kirk's leadership of Turning Point USA. One member of the group told The Daily Beast that "Charlie Kirk can be a little bit of a snowflake — or a lot a bit of a snowflake." Other complaints concerned sexual harassment and assault at TPUSA events.

Alleged tax code violations

In 2017, Jane Mayer of The New Yorker described two separate actions by Turning Point staff in the 2016 election that appear to have violated campaign finance regulations. Charlie Kirk denied any wrongdoing and said it was "completely ludicrous and ridiculous that there's some sort of secret plan." TPUSA attorney Sally Wagenmaker refuted allegations of campaign finance irregularities in an article published by ProPublica in July 2020, stating that "payments to businesses belonging to organization officials 'provided a compelling operational benefit in Turning Point's best and other interests,' and that they were 'in full compliance with TPUSA's IRS-compliant conflict of interest policy.'"

COVID-19 misinformation 
In 2021, TPUSA and Turning Point Action made misleading claims about planned vaccination policies, as well as the dangers of catching COVID-19.

Turning Point organizations

Turning Point Action

Turning Point Action is a 501(c)(4) organization representing right-wing and conservative perspectives. While the group claims to be a "completely separate organization" from Turning Point USA, Forbes noted that both were founded by Kirk and use common marketing and branding styles. Donors to Turning Point Action received a bumper sticker prominently featuring the URL of Turning Point USA's website; the bumper sticker was also available for purchase from Turning Point USA's web store.

In May 2019, it was reported that Kirk was "preparing to unveil" Turning Point Action, a 501(c)(4) entity allowed to target Democrats.

During the  2020 presidential election campaign Turning Point Action paid teenagers  in Arizona, some of them minors, to produce thousands of posts with Turning Point USA content on their own social media accounts without disclosing their relationship with the organization.

Turning Point Faith

In 2021, Charlie Kirk founded Turning Point Faith, an organization that says it is dedicated to "recruit pastors and other church leaders to be active in local and national political issues." The organization promotes a culture war agenda and is intended to attract supporters among religious conservatives. Its activities include faith-based voter drives "and educating members on TPUSA's core values." According to TPUSA's 2021 Investor Prospectus, the program—with a budget of $6.4 million—"will 'address America’s crumbling religious foundation by engaging thousands of pastors nationwide' in order to 'breathe renewed civic engagement into our churches'." Its activities include faith-based voter drives "and educating members on TPUSA's core values."

Turning Point Endowment

Turning Point Endowment Inc. is a self-described "supporting organization" whose "mission is to support and benefit Turning Point USA's charitable purposes and long-term vitality."

Turning Point Academy

In 2021, TPUSA announced Turning Point Academy as an online academy for "families seeking an 'America-first education.'" Plans to develop a curriculum with StrongMind, the firm that owns Arizona charter school Primavera Online High School, were abandoned when StrongMind's key subcontractor, the Freedom Learning Group, an education company run by military spouses and veterans, terminated the contract after finding out that the client was TPUSA.

Foreign offshoots

In 2017, the loosely connected group Turning Point Canada registered a chapter in Canada.                  
In 2019, Turning Point UK was set up in the United Kingdom.

References

External links 
 
 

2012 establishments in the United States
Organizations established in 2012
501(c)(3) organizations
Conservative media in the United States
Conservative political advocacy groups in the United States
Higher education in the United States
Student political organizations in the United States
Political youth organizations in the United States